Cambridge was launched at Whitby in 1797. She traded with New York, and then with Jamaica. In 1805 a French privateer captured her, but the British Royal Navy recaptured her shortly thereafter and she returned to her trade as a West Indiaman. In 1810 she sustained damage while sailing from Jamaica to Liverpool and was condemned at Havana.

Career
Cambridge entered Lloyd's Register (LR)) in the 1798 volume with J. Nevins, master, Fletcher & Co., owner, and trade Liverpool–New York.

On 3 February 1805  recaptured Cambridge, Lewes, master, and her cargo. The French privateer Braave, of 18 guns and 160 men, had captured Cambridge while she was on her way from Jamaica to Liverpool. After her recapture by Moucheron, Cambridge reached Cork on 14 February. Her master then became Catrill (or Cottrel, or Catterall, or Cotterell). On 6 June 1805 he sailed from Cork for Jamaica.

Fate
Lloyd's List for 29 January 1811 reported that Cambridge, Duncan, master, had had to put into Havana with damage. In June Lloyd's List reported that she had been condemned and sold there with her cargo.

Lloyd's Register for 1812 has the notation "cndmnd" by her name. Because of the stale data in Lloyd's Register, one source still showed Cambridge (of Whitby), as being owned by Fletcher in 1814.

Citations and references
Citations

References
 

1797 ships
Ships built in Whitby
Age of Sail merchant ships of England
Captured ships
Maritime incidents in 1810